Depositories Act, 1996 is an Indian legislation.

Amendments
The act was amended by "Enforcement of Security Interest and Recovery of Debts Laws and Miscellaneous Provisions (Amendment) Bill, 2016", passed by Lok Sabha on 2 August 2016.

References

Indian legislation
Financial history of India